Events in the year 1763 in India.

Events
National income - ₹9,859 million
 Seven Years' War, 1756-63.

References

 
India
Years of the 18th century in India